Patzke is a surname. Notable people with the surname include:

Bernd Patzke (born 1943), German footballer
Greta Patzke (born 1974), German chemist
Wolfgang Patzke (1959–2016), German footballer